Coulounieix-Chamiers is a commune in the Dordogne department in Nouvelle-Aquitaine in southwestern France. It is a suburb of Périgueux.

Population

International relations
Coulounieix-Chamiers is twinned with:
Venta de Baños,  Spain
Portlaoise,  Ireland

See also
Communes of the Dordogne department

References

Communes of Dordogne
Dordogne communes articles needing translation from French Wikipedia